Victoria Township may refer to one of the following places:

In Canada

 Victoria Township, Algoma District, Ontario

In the United States

 Victoria Township, Jefferson County, Arkansas
 Victoria Township, Knox County, Illinois
 Victoria Township, Cass County, Iowa
 Victoria Township, Ellis County, Kansas
 Victoria Township, Rice County, Kansas
 Victoria Township, Custer County, Nebraska
 Victoria Township, McLean County, North Dakota

See also

 Victoria (disambiguation)
 Victor Township (disambiguation)
 Victory Township (disambiguation)

Township name disambiguation pages